Coroplast is a brand name of corrugated plastic and a registered trademark of Coroplast, LLC, a member of the Inteplast Group of companies.  Because of the success of this brand, it has become a generically used tradename and many people in North America today refer to all corrugated plastic as "coroplast". Coroplast is produced with Cartonplast technology developted by Covema in 1974. A similar product is marketed in Australia under the brand name Corflute.

Coroplast operates plants in Granby, Quebec; Dallas, Texas; and Vanceburg, Kentucky. On August 15, 2014, Inteplast Group, the company's major competitor, acquired majority of its assets with an undisclosed amount.

Coroplast, also called pp plate sheet ("Fluted Polypropylene Sheet"), is lightweight (hollow structure), non-toxic, waterproof, shockproof, long-lasting material that resists corrosion.  Compared with cardboard, Coroplast has the advantages of being waterproof and colorfast. 
 
The Coroplast composition can be altered to add anti-static properties using the masterbatch technique. This particular masterbatch produces a conductive, anti-static plastic hollow board sheet. (Conductive plate surface resistivity can be controlled between 103 ≈105; anti-static sheet surface resistivity can be controlled between 106 ≈1011.)

As with all corrugated plastic, it is widely used for signage, plastic containers, and reusable packaging. It is also used by hobbyists in do it yourself projects such as constructing cages for small animals or model aircraft.

Modifying Coroplast sheets
All Coroplast twin-wall profile sheets can be modified with additives, which are melt-blended into the sheet to meet the specific needs of the customer. Special products that require additives include: UV protection, anti-static, flame retardant, and custom colors.

See also
 Cartonplast

References

External links
 Coroplast.com

Plastic brands
Brand name materials